Al-Manzel Raqam 13 or Al-Manzel Raqam Talata`sh (House No. 13) is a classic 1952 Egyptian mystery/crime film directed by Kamal El Sheikh. It starred Faten Hamama, Mahmoud El Meliguy, and Emad Hamdy and was chosen as one of the best 150 Egyptian film productions in 1996, during the Egyptian Cinema centennial.

Plot 

A psychotic psychiatrist has killed a young man, `Abbas, and plans a conspiracy. He convinces his friend and patient, Sharif, that he had killed `Abbas after hypnotizing him. He also orders Sharif to give him the money that `Abbas's wife should receive, all to make Sharif seem like the suspect. Sharif is believed to have killed `Abbas for the money, and is shockingly arrested during his wedding.

References 
 Film summary, Faten Hamama's official site. Retrieved on January 10, 2007.
 Film summary, Aramovies. Retrieved on January 10, 2007.

External links 
 

1952 films
1950s Arabic-language films
1952 crime films
1950s mystery films
Films directed by Kamal El Sheikh
Egyptian crime films
Egyptian mystery films
Egyptian black-and-white films